Joel Alf Ivar Gistedt (born December 7, 1987) is a former professional Swedish ice hockey goaltender. He last played for Kristianstads IK in the HockeyAllsvenskan (Allsv). Gistedt was selected by the Phoenix Coyotes in the 2nd round (36th overall) of the 2007 NHL Entry Draft whilst playing as a youth in Frölunda HC organization.

Playing career
After stints with Rögle BK and Karlskoga of the HockeyAllsvenskan on April 18, 2013, Gistedt joined Leksands IF in the Swedish Hockey League.

Gistedt returned to Karlskoga of the Allsvenskan on an initial loan before signing a one-year deal on May 13, 2015.

International play 
He was the starting goalie for the Swedish national junior team in the 2007 World Junior Ice Hockey Championships. Gistedt won LG Hockey Games and Euro Hockey Tour in 2007. He played against Russia on LG Hockey Games 2007 then Sweden won 6:2.

References

External links
 

1987 births
Living people
People from Uddevalla Municipality
Arizona Coyotes draft picks
Arizona Sundogs players
Bofors IK players
Brynäs IF players
Frölunda HC players
Kristianstads IK players
Las Vegas Wranglers players
Leksands IF players
Rögle BK players
San Antonio Rampage players
Swedish ice hockey goaltenders
Sportspeople from Västra Götaland County